Chase Wyatt Blackburn (born June 10, 1983) is a former American football coach and former linebacker who is the special teams coordinator for the Los Angeles Rams of the National Football League (NFL). He was signed by the New York Giants as an undrafted free agent in 2005. He won two Super Bowl titles with the Giants, both against the New England Patriots. He played college football at Akron.

Early years
Blackburn attended Marysville High School in Marysville, Ohio and was a letterman in football and basketball.  In football, as a senior, he led his team to a 13–1 record and the 2001 Ohio High School Football Division II State Seminifinals.  He finished with 320 career tackles.

College career
Blackburn was a three-year starter at the University of Akron, playing both linebacker and defensive end. He started 34 of 45 games in which he played and finished his college career with 293 tackles (179 solo), 11 sacks, 38.5 tackles for losses and three interceptions. He started all 11 games as a senior and finished with 71 tackles (41 solo), 5 sacks and 8.5 tackles for losses playing the "bandit" – a hybrid between the linebacker and defensive end positions. He was named All-MAC linebacker as a junior.

Professional career

Pre-draft
Blackburn measured 6'3" and 245 pounds. At the Akron Pro Day, Blackburn ran a 4.69 40-yard dash.

New York Giants

An undrafted rookie for the New York Giants in 2005, Blackburn spent most of the season as a backup linebacker and special teamer. In Week 16, against the Washington Redskins, he had a 31-yard interception return for a touchdown off of Mark Brunell in the 35–20 loss. He played in 15 games before going on injured reserve.

In Super Bowl XLII, Blackburn had a costly penalty on a punt return as he was the extra man on the field on a 12-man-on-the-field penalty.  After the play, New England Patriots head coach Bill Belichick challenged the play that the Giants had 12 men on the field and won.  The penalty resulted in a first down, but the Patriots did not score on that drive after a failed 4th down conversion. As a result, the Giants improved their field position by 20 yards, so the penalty actually benefited the team. The Giants went on to win the game 17-14.

For 2010, he was elected as a team captain by his teammates, representing special teams. After the season, he became an unrestricted free agent. He was re-signed on November 29, 2011. In Week 13 in a game against the Green Bay Packers, Blackburn recorded an interception against Aaron Rodgers in his own end. In the fourth quarter of Super Bowl XLVI, Blackburn recorded an interception against Patriots quarterback Tom Brady, the lone turnover of the game. On the interception, he won a one-on-one matchup with Rob Gronkowski. He had six tackles in the 21–17 win.

Carolina Panthers
Blackburn agreed to a two-year contract with the Carolina Panthers on March 27, 2013.
Blackburn played a part in Carolina's defense in 2013, complementing Thomas Davis and Luke Kuechly with 33 tackles and 2 stuffs in the regular season and playoffs. On March 10, 2015, Blackburn became a free agent.

Coaching career

Carolina Panthers
During the off season before the 2016 season, Blackburn was brought in as a special teams coaching intern. On August 14, 2016, Blackburn was promoted to the special teams assistant to special teams coordinator Thomas McGaughey.

After the firing of former head coach, Ron Rivera, Blackburn was retained by the Panthers' new head coach, Matt Rhule. After the 2021 regular season ended, Rhule fired Blackburn from his coaching staff in January 2022.

Tennessee Titans
In March 2022, the Tennessee Titans announced the hiring of Blackburn as an assistant special teams coach.

Los Angeles Rams
On February 21, 2023, Blackburn was hired as a special teams coordinator by the Los Angeles Rams.

Personal life
Blackburn and his wife Megan have three sons, Landyn, Bentley, and Wyatt. He graduated from the University of Akron with a degree in mathematics. He lives in Weddington, North Carolina. Blackburn is a Christian.

References

External links
Tennessee Titans bio

1983 births
Living people
Akron Zips football players
American football linebackers
Carolina Panthers players
New York Giants players
People from Dublin, Ohio
People from Bellefontaine, Ohio
Players of American football from Ohio
Carolina Panthers coaches
Tennessee Titans coaches
Los Angeles Rams coaches